WFGN (1180 AM) is a radio station broadcasting a Religious format. Licensed to Gaffney, South Carolina, United States, the station is owned by Hope Broadcasting, Inc.

History
The station went on the air March 8, 1948, as WFGN broadcasting on 1570 kHz with 250 W power (daytime). The licensee was Cherokee Radio Company Incorporated.

References

External links

Radio stations established in 1948
1948 establishments in South Carolina
FGN
FGN